Hypsicles (c. 190 – c. 120 BCE) was an ancient Greek mathematician and astronomer known for authoring On Ascensions (Ἀναφορικός) and the Book XIV of Euclid's Elements. Hypsicles lived in Alexandria.

Life and work 
Although little is known about the life of Hypsicles, it is believed that he authored the astronomical work On Ascensions. The mathematician Diophantus of Alexandria noted on a definition of polygonal numbers, due to Hypsicles:

On Ascensions
In On Ascensions (Ἀναφορικός and sometimes translated On Rising Times), Hypsicles proves a number of propositions on arithmetical progressions and uses the results to calculate approximate values for the times required for the signs of the zodiac to rise above the horizon. It is thought that this is the work from which the division of the circle into 360 parts may have been adopted since it divides the day into 360 parts, a division possibly suggested by Babylonian astronomy, although this is mere speculation and no actual evidence is found to support this. Heath 1921 notes, "The earliest extant Greek book in which the division of the circle into 360 degrees appears".

Euclid's Elements
Hypsicles is more famously known for possibly writing the Book XIV of Euclid's Elements. The book may have been composed on the basis of a treatise by Apollonius. The book continues Euclid's comparison of regular solids inscribed in spheres, with the chief result being that the ratio of the surfaces of the dodecahedron and icosahedron inscribed in the same sphere is the same as the ratio of their volumes, the ratio being .

Heath further notes, "Hypsicles says also that Aristaeus, in a work entitled Comparison of the five figures, proved that the same circle circumscribes both the pentagon of the dodecahedron and the triangle of the icosahedron inscribed in the same sphere; whether this Aristaeus is the same as the Aristaeus of the Solid Loci, the elder (Aristaeus the Elder) contemporary of Euclid, we do not know."

Hypsicles letter
Hypsicles letter was a preface of the supplement taken from Euclid's Book XIV, part of the thirteen books of Euclid's Elements, featuring a treatise.

Notes

References

External links 
The mac-tutor biography of Hypsicles
Hypsicles, from  Smith, Dictionary of Greek and Roman Biography and Mythology

Ancient Greek astronomers
Ancient Greek mathematicians
2nd-century BC Greek people
190s BC births
120s BC deaths
2nd-century BC mathematicians